Miss World USA 1974 was the 13th edition of the Miss World USA pageant and it was held in Binghamton, New York and was won by Terry Ann Browning of Florida. She was crowned by outgoing titleholder, Lexie H. Brockway of Washington. Browning went on to represent the United States at the Miss World 1974 Pageant in London later that year. She finished as 4th Runner-Up at Miss World.

Results

Placements

Delegates
The Miss World USA 1974 delegates were:

 Alabama - Gwendolyn Joyce McIntosh
 Alaska - Randie L. Wood
 Arizona - Sherry Love
 Arkansas - Rhonde Renee Rice
 California - Susan Elaine Palmer
 Colorado - Sulinda Madsen
 Connecticut - Joan Lois Ellegard
 Delaware - Penelope L. Burr
 District of Columbia - Stephanie Olds
 Florida -  Terry Ann Browning
 Georgia - Deborah Lynn Crowe
 Hawaii - Gloria McCafferty
 Idaho - Lynn Whitesides
 Illinois - Suzanne Piché
 Indiana - Jo Ellen Berryman
 Iowa - Diane Pangburn
 Kansas - Jani Johnson
 Kentucky - Janis Lane Tingle
 Louisiana - Rhonda H. Shear
 Maine - Emily Ann Doak
 Maryland - Deborah Lynn Goode
 Massachusetts - Kathleen Ellen Walas
 Michigan - Marilyn Ann Petty
 Minnesota - Mary Montgomery
 Mississippi - Wanda Anne Gatlin
 Missouri - Susanne Burns
 Montana - Kathy M. Sather
 Nebraska - Janet Kay Goode
 Nevada - Pamela Payton
 New Hampshire - Peggy Ann Jacobson
 New Jersey - Ginger Hagaman
 New Mexico - Terri Lynn Whiteman
 New York - Debra Ann Purritano
 North Carolina - Gail Lynn Hinton
 North Dakota - Jaclyn Ann Ross 
 Ohio - Jacqueline M. Urbanek
 Oklahoma - Brenda Lisa Barr
 Oregon - Therese Jeanne McClendon
 Pennsylvania - Constance Marie Rauback
 Rhode Island - Luanne J. Cavaliaro
 South Carolina - Donna Lynn McFarland
 Tennessee - Carolyn Eaton
 Texas - Kimberly Louise Tomes
 Utah - Cheryl Lee Walker
 Vermont - Cynthia Anne Hackel
 Virginia - Patricia Lynn Bailey
 Washington - Norene Lee Gilbert
 West Virginia - Charmane Bennett
 Wisconsin - Nicolette Edwardsen

Notes

Did not Compete

Crossovers
Contestants who competed in other beauty pageants:

Miss USA
1972: : Marilyn Ann Petty (Top 12)
1973: : Jacqueline M. Urbanek
1975: : Jo Ellen Berryman (Top 12)
1976: : Ginger Hagaman
1976: : Norene Lee Gilbert (Top 12)
1977: : Kimberly Louise Tomes (Winner)
1978: : Suzanne Piché

Miss Universe
1977: : Kimberly Louise Tomes (Top 12; as )

Miss America
1976: : Janet Kay Goode

Miss International
1975: : Patricia Lynn Bailey (3rd Runner-Up; as )

References

External links
Miss World Official Website
Miss World America Official Website

1974 in the United States
World America
1974
1974 in New York (state)